Ham Chan (also Romanized as Ham Chān and Hamechān; also known as Hameh Chān) is a village in Tuskacheshmeh Rural District, in the Central District of Galugah County, Mazandaran Province, Iran. At the 2006 census, its population was 68, in 18 families.

References 

Populated places in Galugah County